Angelo Lopeboselli (born 10 April 1977, in Gavardo) is an Italian former cyclist. His biggest result was at the 2003 Giro di Lombardia, where he finished second. He also competed in the 2003 Vuelta a España, finishing 90th overall.

Major results

1997
 3rd Overall Giro della Valle d'Aosta
1998
 1st Stage 6 Giro della Valle d'Aosta
1999
 2nd Overall Girobio
1st Stages 7 & 9
 8th Under-23 Road race, World Road Championships
2000
 7th Overall GP du Midi Libre
2002
 7th Grand Prix de Wallonie
2003
 2nd Giro di Lombardia
 3rd Giro del Piemonte
 9th Overall Settimana Internazionale Coppi e Bartali

References

1977 births
Living people
Italian male cyclists
Cyclists from the Province of Brescia